Metgal  is a village in the southern state of Karnataka, India. It is located in the Koppal taluk of Koppal district in Karnataka State. Koppal is 24km from Metgal.

See also
 Koppal
 Districts of Karnataka

References

External links
 https://web.archive.org/web/20190810051205/https://koppal.nic.in/

Villages in Koppal district